The Women's time trial of the 2008 Dutch National Time Trial Championships cycling event took place on 31 August 2008 in and around Oudenbosch, the Netherlands. The competition was run over a 22.8 km course. 31 cyclists participated in the contest. Ellen van Dijk was the defending champion.

Mirjam Melchers won the time trial in a time of 31' 15" ahead of Kirsten Wild and Loes Gunnewijk.

Final classification

Results from cqranking.com  and cyclingarchives.com

References

External links

Dutch National Time Trial Championships
2008 in women's road cycling